The UCI Trials World Championships are the world championship events in trials organised by the Union Cycliste Internationale (UCI), the governing body of world cycling. The first three finishers in each category are awarded gold, silver, and bronze medals. The winner of each category is also entitled to wear the rainbow jersey in events in that category until the following year's World Championships.

History
The UCI Trials World Championships were held for the first time in 1986. Until 1999 they were held separately from the UCI World Championships in other cycling disciplines. From 2000 to 2016 they were combined with the world championships in other mountain-biking disciplines and run as the UCI Mountain Bike & Trials World Championships. Beginning in 2017, the UCI world championships in trials will be held as part of the newly created UCI Urban Cycling World Championships, which will also include the UCI world championships in freestyle BMX and cross-country eliminator.

Separate titles are awarded for men and women. The men's events include categories for junior and "elite" (an open age category) using bicycles with 20" and 26" wheels. There is also a team event, in which each country enters one junior and one elite 20" rider, one junior and one elite 26" rider, and one female rider.

From 1986 to 1994 there were no separate categories for bikes with different wheel sizes. The 20" and 26" categories were introduced in 1995. The women's category was introduced in 2001. A team event has been included since the first UCI world championships in 1986, though the format has varied over time.

Venues

UCI Trials World Champions
 Men's trials, 20 inch
 Men's trials, 26 inch
 Junior men's trials, 20 inch
 Junior men's trials, 26 inch
 Women's trials

References

External links

 UCI trials page

Trials
Recurring sporting events established in 1986